Don't Tell the Bride is a British reality television series. The premise of the series surrounds couples being awarded money to fund their wedding ceremony; however, every aspect of the ceremony must be organised by the groom, with no contact with the bride.

Broadcast history
The series first premiered on BBC Three on 8 November 2007. In February 2012, it was announced that the show had been nominated for a Rose d'Or award for best 'Factual Entertainment' show. Due to the impending shutdown of BBC Three as a linear television service, the 9th series of the programme was moved to BBC One. With the confirmed shutdown of BBC Three, as well as falling viewership in response to changes in the programme's format that occurred upon the move, the BBC dropped Don't Tell the Bride. The series was then picked up for its 2016 series by Sky 1. In 2017, it moved to E4 where it would broadcast a new 18-episode series later that year.

Reruns of the show, including the BBC and Sky One series are currently broadcast on E4 Extra.

Format
The show's format consists of a couple who are given £12,000 (£14,000 in the BBC One and E4 versions) to spend on their wedding. However, they must spend three weeks apart with no contact, and the groom must organise every aspect of the event and attire, including the wedding dress, wedding cake, as well as the hen and stag parties, surprising the bride.

Although the series mostly features heterosexual couples, one episode broadcast in October 2010 featured a gay couple and another in November 2011 featured a lesbian couple, both preparing for their civil partnership.

Controversy
In 2019, the show’s producers were forced to cancel a wedding after some suspicions occurred as to whether the bride had been in contact with the groom. After a full investigation the production team summoned the groom to meet up at the bride’s parents house to discuss the outcome. The bride admitted that she was regularly sent emails from the groom to let her know what was happening for the wedding day. This was breaching the shows rules as the bride is not supposed to know anything until the wedding day and the wedding day is all down to the groom and the best man, the bridesmaids and the bride’s parents are the only ones who can speak to the groom whilst the bride can only speak to the best man.

Reception
 Nominated: Factual Entertainment – Rose d'Or 2012
 Nominated: Reality & Constructed Factual – British Academy Television Awards 2012

Transmissions

BBC Three

BBC One

Sky 1

E4

Specials

International versions
Internationally, the series has attracted a strong following, with broadcast deals spanning 120 territories.

As of 2012, twelve locally produced versions have aired around the world. They are: Australia (Network 10, 2012), Denmark (TV 2, 2009–), Finland (Liv), Greece & Cyprus (ANT1, 2011), Germany (RTL II, 2011–), Ireland (RTÉ, 2010–), Italy (Lei), Norway (TLC Norway), Poland (TLC Poland, 2011), Sweden (TV4), Turkey and United States. Various clips from some versions were shown in the 'Goes Global' special in 2012.

The UK version has also been picked up by Russian broadcaster TLC, Vivolta in France, NHK in Japan and RTL Nederland in the Netherlands, who has secured an option to produce a local version of the format.

An Irish version of the show airs on RTÉ Two since 2010. A two episode Irish special, in which the couple's budget was €10,000, was first broadcast in May 2011 on RTÉ. A full series was aired in 2012. The Irish version also airs on Living in New Zealand and on Really in the UK.

In October 2011, the first series of the US version of Don't Tell The Bride was shown on OWN. In this version, the groom is given USD $25,000 to spend. In 2013, the series is being produced by Shed Media US for the USA Network. Shed Media conducted casting for the series between 14 June 2013 through 19 July 2013.

On 21 August 2012, an Australian version of Don't Tell the Bride began airing on Network Ten. Kate Ritchie was the narrator. In this version, the groom is given A$25,000 to organise the entire wedding. It was cancelled after one season.

In November 2016, a similarly formatted Welsh-language reality television show titled Priodas Pum Mil premiered on S4C.

On 31 August 2020 the most watched channel in Portugal, SIC, released their version of the show called "" hosted by the actress Cláudia Vieira.

References

External links
  (BBC Three)
 Don't Tell the Bride (BBC One)
 
 Don't Tell the Bride at DRG.tv

2007 British television series debuts
2000s British reality television series
2010s British reality television series
2020s British reality television series
BBC reality television shows
E4 reality television shows
English-language television shows
Sky UK original programming
Television series by Warner Bros. Television Studios
Wedding television shows
British television series revived after cancellation